This is a progressive list of men's association footballers who have held or co-held the European record for international caps since 1976. The progression up to 1976 is derivable from the world record progression because the world record holder was always European, except when Ángel Romano narrowly overtook Imre Schlosser in 1924–27.  After 1976, many sources, including FIFA and the Guinness Book of Records reported subsequent European cap records as world records.  Retrospective validation of various Asian players' caps has subsequently shown that they exceeded the contemporary European record; most sweepingly, in 2021 FIFA recognised that Soh Chin Ann won his 109th Malaysia cap in 1976 and his 195th and final cap in 1984, which  remains the world record.

The only pre-1976 European records not listed in the world record progression are Schlosser's record-breaking 67th cap and Severino Minelli's record-equalling 68th cap.

Notes:

See also
 Progression of association football caps record (world record)
 List of football (soccer) players with 100 or more caps

References
 Players with 100+ Caps and 30+ International Goals RSSSF

Association football record progressions
Association football in Europe